Thomas Oliver was a 43-year-old Irish farmer who was tortured and murdered by the Provisional Irish Republican Army in 1991, reportedly for passing information to the Garda Síochána. However, in the wake of the Stakeknife case it began to be suspected that Freddie Scappaticci – who ran the IRA's Internal Security Unit, which was responsible for torturing and killing Thomas Oliver – killed Oliver to conceal his identity as a double agent.

Overview
A farmer with no connections to any paramilitary group or the security forces, Oliver was a 43-year-old father of seven children, and a native of Riverstown, County Louth, on the Cooley peninsula, near Dundalk. He was abducted by armed members of the Provisional Irish Republican Army (IRA) near the border on 18 July and his body was found the following day near Belleek, County Armagh. He had been shot several times in the head.

The IRA, via An Phoblacht, claimed he had been passing information to the Garda Síochána. They also claimed that Oliver had aided the IRA, providing sheds to store weapons and explosives, but that over a six-year period he had given information to the Gardaí, leading to several arrests. His body showed clear evidence of massive pre-mortem trauma, indicating extensive torture. A family member stated:

Thomas Oliver was survived by his wife, six daughters and a son. His mother, Annie, died in September 1991, reportedly from the shock and strain of her son's death. The Irish Times of 24 November 1991, reported:

Aftermath
In the wake of the Stakeknife case, where a highly placed member of the IRA was revealed to be a British double agent, it began to be suspected that Freddie Scappaticci – who ran the IRA's Internal Security Unit, which was responsible for torturing and killing Thomas Oliver – killed Oliver to conceal his identity.

It emerged that, in 1989, Oliver, in the course of drainage work on his farm, unwittingly uncovered a barrel. He reported the discovery to the Gardaí but was unaware of its contents. The barrel contained IRA guns hidden on Oliver's land but without his knowledge. Two of those questioned about the arms in 1989 were County Louth natives Michael Christopher McDonald and Declan John Rafferty. Both men were at the time members of the IRA and later went on to join the Real IRA. In 2002, along with Fintan Paul O'Farrell, also a native of County Louth, the Slovak Three were sentenced to 30 years imprisonment for arms smuggling.

An Phoblacht ("War News" section) on 25 July 1991 was headlined IRA Executes Informer. The section justified Oliver's murder:

In 2002, Thomas Oliver's son Eugene (aged 13 at the time of his father's death) wrote a public letter to the Dundalk newspaper, Argus, demanding answers to a series of questions directed at Sinn Féin's election candidate, Arthur Morgan regarding his father. Argus published the letter on its front page. Sinn Féin declined to comment; a spokesman said the party had no comment to make on the Real IRA trio, stating "They have nothing to do with us". Morgan was elected as TD  for the Louth constituency, serving from 2002 to 2011; he was succeeded by Gerry Adams.

2021 new DNA evidence
Investigators working in Operation Kenova announced that they had obtained new DNA evidence relating to the murder.

See also
Similar IRA murders
 Murder of Jean McConville
 Charles Armstrong
 Murders of Catherine and Gerard Mahon
 Columba McVeigh
 Peter Wilson (Northern Ireland kidnapping and disappearance case)

References and sources
Notes

Sources
 Lost Lives: The stories of the men, women and children who died as a result of the Northern Ireland Troubles, pp. 1242–43, McKittrick, Kelters, Feeney, Thompson, 1999 (2006); .

External links
 "Tom Oliver's murder began a wave of outrage against the IRA, ... ", Raidió Teilifís Éireann; accessed 23 September 2014.

1991 deaths
Deaths by firearm in the Republic of Ireland
Deaths by person in the Republic of Ireland
Irish torture victims
Irish murder victims
Male murder victims
People from County Louth
People killed by the Provisional Irish Republican Army
People murdered in the Republic of Ireland
1991 murders in the Republic of Ireland
History of County Armagh